HMS Diligente was the French privateer Diligente that  captured on 22 February 1813.

Capture: On 22 February 1813 Cephalus, after a nine-hour chase, captured the French privateer lugger Diligente, Bonet, master, in the Mediterranean. Diligente, of Marseilles, was pierced for fourteen guns but only had eight mounted; she threw four of her 12-pounder carronades overboard during the chase. She was 26 days out of Marseilles but had captured nothing.  

Diligente arrived at Plymouth on 20 August 1814. The "Principal Officers and Commissioners of His Majesty's Navy" offered  the "Diligent lugger, of 105 tons", lying at Plymouth, for sale on 15 December. She sold there, on that date, for £200.

Notes

Citations

References
  

1810s ships
Privateer ships of France
Captured ships
Luggers of the Royal Navy